On 2 July 2009, Pakatan Rakyat announced a list of its Members of Parliament who would shadow individual ministries. DAP Member of Parliament Tony Pua stated that this front bench would explicitly not be a Shadow Cabinet because the Malaysian Parliament does not recognise the institution of a Shadow Cabinet.

Members of the Frontbench Committees

References

Opposition of Malaysia
Politics of Malaysia